Wilhelm Christian Wedel-Jarlsberg (February 20, 1852 at Vækerø Manor – September 16, 1909 in Einsiedeln) was a Norwegian nobleman and papal chamberlain.

He was the son of Baron Herman Wedel-Jarlsberg (Bogstad) and Edle Frederikke Rosenørn Lehn. He became an officer of the Norwegian Army in 1875 and in 1879, he was appointed a chamberlain at the Norwegian court. After converting to Catholicism along with his wife, he had to leave the Lutheran court in Norway, but was appointed a papal chamberlain by Pope Leo XIII in 1882. He lived with his family at the Palazzo Farnese in Rome.

References

1852 births
1909 deaths
Converts to Roman Catholicism from Lutheranism
Norwegian Roman Catholics
Papal chamberlains
Wilhelm